Gustav Heine may refer to:

 Gustav Heine von Geldern (1812–1886), German-Austrian publicist
 Gustav Otto Ludolf Heine (1868–1959), owner of Heine Piano Company